Teui "TC" Robati (born 14 November 2001) is a New Zealand professional rugby league footballer who last played as a er for the Brisbane Broncos in the NRL.

Background 
Born in Porirua, New Zealand, Robati is of Cook Islands and Māori descent. 

He played his junior rugby league for the Porirua Vikings before being signed by the Brisbane Broncos. In Australia, he attended Mabel Park State High School and Marsden State High School, where he represented the Queensland Schoolboys.

Playing career

Early career
In 2020, he played for Wynnum Manly's Hastings Deering Colts side.

2021
In 2021, Robati joined Brisbane's NRL squad on a development contract and played for Wynnum Manly in the Queensland Cup.

In Round 12 of the 2021 NRL season, Robati was named to make his NRL debut against the Melbourne Storm.
The following week, he scored two tries in a 52-24 loss against St. George Illawarra.

2022
Robati played seven games for Brisbane in the 2022 NRL season as the club finished 9th on the table.

Controversy
In September 2021, Robati was arrested by police after a dangerous driving incident.  It was alleged that Robati was a passenger in his girlfriend's vehicle when he grabbed on the steering wheel which caused the car to swerve across other lanes on the road and veered into oncoming traffic. Robati later received a $1,000 fine with no conviction recorded, and a six-month disqualification from driving.
On 30 December 2022, it was announced that Robati had been stood down from all club activities, following an alleged incident involving a woman at a Brisbane venue. Robati was ordered to attend court in January 2023 after being charged with one count of sexual assault in relation to the incident which happened on 21 December 2022.
On 2 February 2023, it was revealed that Robati had been charged by Queensland Police for allegedly driving without a licence around 3.50pm on Australia Day. Robati was ordered to appear Brisbane Magistrates Court on 2 March 2023.

References

External links 
Brisbane Broncos profile

2001 births
Living people
Brisbane Broncos players
New Zealand Māori rugby league players
New Zealand sportspeople of Cook Island descent
New Zealand rugby league players
Rugby league players from Porirua
Rugby league second-rows
Wynnum Manly Seagulls players